José Francos Rodríguez (1862–1931) was a Spanish politician and journalist. He served as Mayor of Madrid as well as Minister of Public Instruction and Fine Arts and Minister of Grace and Justice during the reign of Alfonso XIII.

Biography 
Born on 5 April 1862 in Madrid to a humble family, his father was car driver. He graduated as physician and worked as such for a decade. A Mason and adept to liberal views, he became a journalist, writer and politician.

He was Mayor of Madrid from 10 February 1910 to 16 March 1912 during a first spell.

Appointed as Civil Governor of the Province of Barcelona in June 1913, he faced the strike initiated by the textile workers of La Constancia in the summer of 2013 taking a role as mediator in the conflict.

From April to June 1917, he was Minister of Public Instruction and Fine Arts in a cabinet presided by Manuel García Prieto.

He served again as Mayor of the Spanish capital from 17 June 1917 to 30 April 1918.

He was President of Press Association of Madrid from 1920 to 1931.

He served as Minister of Grace and Justice from August 1921 to March 1922 in a Maura cabinet.

He became a member of the Spanish Royal Academy on 16 November 1924.

He died on 13 July 1931 at calle de Valenzuela 4, Madrid.

References 

|-

|-

|-

|-

Mayors of Madrid
Education ministers of Spain
Justice ministers of Spain
Spanish Freemasons
Civil governors of Barcelona